The CSX 8888 incident, also known as the Crazy Eights incident, was a runaway train event involving a CSX Transportation freight train in the U.S. state of Ohio on May 15, 2001. It was finally halted by a railroad crew in a second locomotive, which caught up with the runaway train and coupled their locomotive to the rear car. 

As of 2021, the locomotive is still in service, having been rebuilt and upgraded into an SD40-3 as part of a refurbishment program carried out by CSX, although its number is now #4389. It was delivered as Conrail #6410 in September 1987.

Timeline

On May 15, 2001, a CSX locomotive engineer was using Locomotive #8888 to move a string of freight cars from track K12 to track D10 for departure on another train at Stanley Yard in Walbridge, Ohio, CSX's primary classification yard for Toledo. The string consisted of 47 freight cars; 25 of them were empty, but 22 of them were fully loaded, including two tank cars containing thousands of gallons of molten phenol, a toxic ingredient used in paints, glues, and dyes. It causes severe chemical burns upon direct skin or eye contact, and is exceedingly harmful when ingested.

The engineer noticed a misaligned switch and concluded that his train, although moving slowly, would not be able to stop short of it. He decided to climb down from the train, correctly align the switch, and reboard the locomotive.

Before leaving the cab, the engineer applied the locomotive's independent air brake. During mainline operation, he would also have applied the automatic air brake, which would set the brakes in each of the train's cars. But, as is normal for intra-yard movements, the air brakes of the train were disconnected from the locomotive and thus were not functional. Furthermore, applying the locomotive's brakes disabled the train's dead man's switch, which would otherwise have applied the train brakes and cut the engine power. 

The engineer also attempted to apply the locomotive's dynamic brake to slow the train to a crawl; dynamic brakes dissipate momentum (kinetic energy) by using the momentum of the train to drive the traction motors, generating electricity exactly like a regenerative braking system does in a hybrid/electric automobile, which slows the train. However, the engineer "inadvertently failed to complete the selection process", meaning that he in effect set the train to accelerate, not to brake. Using the power throttle handle, the throttle for the traction motors was set at notch 8. If the dynamic brakes had been properly engaged as intended, the locomotive would have used the motors against the momentum of the train as generators, causing it to slow down. Instead, the train began to accelerate. Therefore, the only functioning brake was the air brakes on the locomotive, and this was not enough to counteract its power.

The engineer climbed down from the cab, aligned the switch, and then attempted to reboard the accelerating locomotive. The train rolled out of the yard and began a  journey south through northwest Ohio unmanned. Attempts to derail the train using a portable derailer failed; the portable derailer was thrown off the track by the force of the train when struck. Police officers attempted to engage the red fuel cutoff button by shooting at it; after three shots mistakenly hit the larger red fuel cap, this ultimately had no effect because the button on former Conrail SD40-2s like CSX 8888 must be pressed for several seconds before the switch is activated, causing the engine to starve of diesel fuel and shut down. A northbound freight train, Q636-15, was directed onto a siding where the crew uncoupled its locomotive, CSX #8392 (another EMD SD40-2), and waited for the runaway train to pass. #8392 had a crew of two: Jesse Knowlton, an engineer with 31 years of service; and Terry L. Forson, a conductor with one year's experience. Together they chased the runaway train. An EMD GP40-2, CSX locomotive #6008, was prepared farther down the line to couple to the front of the runaway to slow it further, if necessary.

Knowlton and Forson successfully coupled onto the rear car and slowed the train by applying the dynamic brakes on the chase locomotive. The train was stopped at the Ohio State Route 31 crossing, just southeast of Kenton, Ohio before reaching locomotive #6008. All the brake shoes on #8888 had been completely burned off by the heat, since they had been applied all throughout the runaway trip.

CSX never made public the name of the 35-year veteran engineer whose error caused the runaway, nor what disciplinary action was taken.

Preservation attempts
Several railway museums tried to buy #8888, but CSX officials replied that they did not feel the locomotive was worthy of preservation and that it would be rebuilt as part of the SD40-3 rebuild program in late 2014 and early 2015. The locomotive remains in service as of 2022 but now operates as CSX SD40-3 #4389.

In film
The incident inspired the 2010 movie Unstoppable.

References

External links
 WUPW FOX36 Toledo story on Unstoppable, including video of 2001 incident 

Transportation in Hancock County, Ohio
Transportation in Hardin County, Ohio
Accidents and incidents involving CSX Transportation
Railway accidents in 2001
Railway accidents and incidents in Ohio
Transportation in Wood County, Ohio
2001 in Ohio
Runaway train disasters
May 2001 events in the United States